The Gilbert Arizona Temple at 3301 South Greenfield Road at the corner of East Pecos Road in Gilbert, Arizona, is a temple of the Church of Jesus Christ of Latter-day Saints (LDS Church).  The design of the temple was overseen by Gregory B. Lambright of Architekton. Groundbreaking took place in 2010 and the temple was dedicated in 2014.

History
The announcement of the temple on April 26, 2008 came concurrently with the Gila Valley Arizona Temple, which were the first new temples announced after Thomas S. Monson assumed responsibilities as LDS Church president. It is the 142nd temple of the LDS Church, and the fourth temple built in the state of Arizona.

The temple is near the intersection of Pecos and Greenfield roads in a rapidly growing part of the southeast Phoenix metropolitan area. The temple was built in response to the high concentration of church members in the area and will help ease the load on the nearby Mesa Arizona Temple.

The Gilbert town council gave unanimous approval to requested zoning changes in a meeting on September 29, 2009. Key among the requests was an allowance to build to a height of 85 feet, higher than the existing restriction at 45 feet.  The temple's planned  steeple did not require an exemption, as the town does not restrict the height of steeples. While not providing a specific timeframe for construction, an anticipated completion within three years was repeated at the meeting. 

The temple sits on 15.4 acres of land, bounded by Greenfield and Pecos Roads and Somerset and Granview Boulevards.  It stands at 195 feet tall with the addition of an angel Moroni statue put in place on May 15, 2012, and is 85,326 square feet. The building's exterior is completed with light cream colored precast concrete with white quartz. The interior is decorated in blues, greens, and earth tones on the walls and stained glass windows with the same scheme. Some limestone completes the beauty of the temple along with eucalyptus wood, white oak, and painted hardwoods.

Claudio R. M. Costa presided at a groundbreaking ceremony on November 13, 2010, with completion of the temple expected to take approximately two years. During construction a trailer at the site served as a visitors' center, greeting guests and answering questions. A public open house was held from January 18 to February 15, 2014. The temple was formally dedicated on March 2, 2014 by Henry B. Eyring and Monson. Like all LDS Church temples, the temple in Gilbert was built and dedicated as a "refuge from the storms of life and the noise of the world" for church members.

In 2020, the Gilbert Arizona Temple was closed in response to the coronavirus pandemic.

See also

 Comparison of temples of The Church of Jesus Christ of Latter-day Saints
 List of temples of The Church of Jesus Christ of Latter-day Saints
 List of temples of The Church of Jesus Christ of Latter-day Saints by geographic region
 Temple architecture (LDS Church)
 The Church of Jesus Christ of Latter-day Saints in Arizona

References

External links

 Gilbert Arizona Temple Official site
 Gilbert Arizona Temple at ChurchofJesusChristTemples.org
 Dedicatory Prayer

Temples (LDS Church) in Arizona
Gilbert, Arizona
Religious buildings and structures completed in 2014
21st-century Latter Day Saint temples
2014 establishments in Arizona
2014 in Christianity